Deruelle is a surname. Notable people with the surname include:

Dayna Deruelle (born 1982), Canadian curler
Dimitri Deruelle (born 1971), French yacht racer
 (1915–2001), French essayist
Nathalie Deruelle (born 1952), French physicist

See also
Druelle
French toponymic surnames